Linda Sibiya is a retired South African radio DJ, entrepreneur and radio producer and television producer best known as a host on Ukhozi FM. Sibiya was born and raised in EShowe, North of KwaZulu-Natal. He made his acting debut in award-winning film Uhlanga the Mark.

Filmography 
 2012 - Uhlanga the Mark

References

Living people
South African radio producers
Women radio producers
Women DJs
South African radio presenters
South African women radio presenters
Year of birth missing (living people)